Dantzler Plantation, also known as Four Hole Plantation House or SunnySide House, is a historic plantation house located near Holly Hill, Orangeburg County, South Carolina. It was built about 1846–1850, and is a two-story, frame raised cottage in the Greek Revival style.  It features a front portico.  The main block is connected at the rear to a -story kitchen structure.  The property includes a contributing oak allee and an entry gate.

It was added to the National Register of Historic Places in 2007.

References

External links
 Historic Dantzler Plantation - Orangeburg County, S.C.

Plantation houses in South Carolina
Houses on the National Register of Historic Places in South Carolina
Greek Revival houses in South Carolina
Houses completed in 1850
Houses in Orangeburg County, South Carolina
National Register of Historic Places in Orangeburg County, South Carolina